Abdus Sattar Khan Niazi (مولاناعبدالستارخان نیازی) (1 October 1915 – 2 May 2001) was a Pakistani religious and political leader.

Early life
He was born on 1 October 1915 at Isakhel in Mianwali District, Punjab, British India. After initial education, he gained religious education in Lahore. He obtained his master's degree from Islamia College, Lahore in 1940, and later became its Dean of Islamic Studies. He remained Dean until 1947, after which he joined active politics.

Niazi vigorously participated in the political struggle for the creation of Pakistan and the Pakistan Movement, and became the President of the Punjab Muslim Students Federation in 1938. He then served in the position of the President of the Provincial (Punjab) Muslim League until the creation of Pakistan in 1947. He was considered among the trusted companions of both Muhammad Iqbal and Muhammad Ali Jinnah.

He was briefly arrested along with Abul Ala Maududi by the Pakistan Army for purportedly inciting the Lahore riots of 1953 against the Ahmadiyya. Both Maududi and Abdul Sattar Niazi were then sentenced to death by a military court but later released.
 
According to Dawn newspaper, "Capital punishment being irreversible, no remedy is available if a person's innocence is established after his execution. One shudders to imagine what might have happened if the sentence of death awarded to Maulana Maudoodi and Maulana Abdul Sattar Niazi by a military court in 1953 had been promptly carried out. Fears of miscarriage of justice have persuaded most sensible Muslim scholars to follow the dictum that it is better to let a culprit walk free than hang an innocent person".

He worked as the Secretary General of the Central Jamiat Ulema-e-Pakistan, a Sunni Barelvi political party from 1973 to 1989 and was elected as the President of the Central Jamiat Ulema-e-Pakistan in 1989. He was a beacon of light for his party's workers and a dominating political figure in Mianwali District for many years.

Political career
Abdul Sattar Khan Niazi served as a member of Provincial Assembly of the Punjab, Lahore from 1947 to 1949.

He was elected member of the National Assembly of Pakistan twice, in 1988 and 1990.

He was elected to the Senate of Pakistan in 1994 for a six years term.

Death and legacy
Abdul Sattar Khan Niazi died in 2001. Niazi never married and had no children.

References

1915 births
2001 deaths
Pakistani Sunni Muslims
People from Mianwali District
Government Islamia College alumni
Pashtun people
Politicians from Punjab, Pakistan
Muslim reformers
Jamiat Ulema-e-Pakistan politicians
Barelvis
Federal ministers of Pakistan
Pakistani MNAs 1988–1990
Pakistani MNAs 1990–1993
Pakistan Movement activists
Members of the Senate of Pakistan